Noix Creek is a stream in Pike County in the U.S. state of Missouri. It is a tributary of the Mississippi River which it enters on the southeast side of the city of Louisiana.

Noix Creek was so named on account of nut-bearing trees along its course, the name noix meaning "nut" in French.

See also
List of rivers of Missouri

References

Rivers of Pike County, Missouri
Rivers of Missouri